The Chairman of the Executive Council of the Isle of Man was the executive head of the Isle of Man Government from 1961 to 1986.  The title of the office was changed in 1986 to Chief Minister.

Chairmen

See also
Chief Minister
Executive Council of the Isle of Man

Chairmen of the Executive Council of the Isle of Man
Government of the Isle of Man
Man